Dmitri Petrovich Barannik (born November 9, 1963 in Leningrad, now St. Petersburg) is a retired Russian professional footballer.

He has coached several clubs in Norway, and has worked at the Norwegian College of Elite Sport.

Honours
 Soviet Top League champion: 1984.

External links
 Интервью «СЭ»

1963 births
Living people
Soviet footballers
Russian footballers
Soviet expatriate footballers
Russian expatriate footballers
FC Zenit Saint Petersburg players
FK Mjølner players
Strømsgodset Toppfotball players
Lyn Fotball players
Expatriate footballers in Norway
Russian emigrants to Norway
Soviet Top League players
Eliteserien players
Footballers from Saint Petersburg
Lesgaft National State University of Physical Education, Sport and Health alumni
Association football midfielders